Życie po śmierci (English: Life After Death), stylized as Życie po śmierci) is an album by Polish hip-hop rapper and producer O.S.T.R., released on February 26, 2016 on Asfalt Records. O.S.T.R. said that the main factor that made him record Życie po śmierci was his disease he had at the beginning of 2015. He had to have his lung removed, due to the fact that he had been smoking for most of his life. He also claimed that this album is the most personal project he had ever recorded. The main inspiration for the title of the album was the Notorious B.I.G.'s 1997 project Life After Death. A special website was created to promote the album. On the website O.S.T.R. left a letter written to his fans, when he recalls a story of his disease and informs that Życie po śmierci is going to be a soundtrack for a "book or rap musical".

Życie po śmierci was entirely produced by O.S.T.R. and Dutch duo Killing Skills. The first single "We krwi (Since I Saw You)" was released on February 1, 2016. There was an extra CD entitled Życie po śmierci (Snap Jazz Edition) that could be bought only through Asfalt Records' official website and at the Asfalt Shop in Warsaw. The extra CD consists of jazz remixes produced by Killing Skills themselves and played by various jazz musician.

The album debuted at number 1 on Polish chart and having sold 90 000 copies up to February 8, 2017.

Track listing

Charts and certifications

Weekly charts

Certifications

References

External links 
 Official site of Życie po śmierci

O.S.T.R. albums
2016 albums
Polish-language albums